HC Ryazan is an ice hockey team in Ryazan, Russia. They play in the VHL, the second level of ice hockey in Russia. The club is affiliated with a KHL team Sibir Novosibirsk since 2012.

History
The team was founded in 1997 as Vyatich Ryazan. It inheriting its name from an older ice hockey team that represented the city of Ryazan in minor Soviet and Russian hockey championships. It was renamed as the Hockey Club Ryazan in 1999.

External links
Official site

Ice hockey teams in Russia
Sport in Ryazan
Ice hockey clubs established in 1999
1999 establishments in Russia